A guardian angel is a spirit who is believed to protect and to guide a particular person.

Guardian angel(s) may also refer to:

Churches and schools 
 Guardian Angels Roman Catholic Church, Santee, California, U.S. (near San Diego)
 Holy Guardian Angels Church and Cemetery Historic District, listed on the National Register of Historic Places in Carroll County, Iowa, US
 Guardian Angels Church (Chaska, Minnesota), a Roman Catholic church and affiliated school in Chaska, Minnesota, U.S.
 Guardian Angel Cathedral, a Roman Catholic cathedral in Las Vegas, Nevada, U.S.
 Church of the Guardian Angel (Manhattan), in New York City
 Guardian Angel Parish School, a Manhattan school in the Roman Catholic Archdiocese of New York, U.S.
 Guardian Angels Regional School, in Paulsboro and Gibbstown, New Jersey
 Guardian Angels School (Cincinnati), a Roman Catholic school in Cincinnati, Ohio, U.S.
 Church of the Guardian Angel, in Wallis Texas

Literature 
 Guardian Angel (comics) or Hop Harrigan, a fictional DC Comics character
 "Guardian Angel" (short story), a short story by Arthur C. Clarke
 Guardian Angel, a 2012 novel in Robert Muchamore's CHERUB series
 Guardian Angel, novel by Sara Paretsky

Music 
 "Guardian Angel" (Drafi Deutscher song), released under the band name of Masquerade, 1983
 "Guardian Angel" (K-System song), 2004
 Guardian Angel (album), a 1984 album by The Shadows
 "Guardian Angels" (Harpo Marx song), a 1945 song recorded by Mario Lanza
 "Guardian Angels" (The Judds song), a 1990 song by The Judds
 "Guardian Angel" (XXXTentacion song), a 2018 song by XXXTentacion
 "Guardian Angel", a song by Abandon All Ships from Geeving
 "Guardian Angel", a song by Cinta Laura from Cinta Laura
 "Guardian Angel", a song by Juno Reactor from Beyond the Infinite
 "Guardian Angel", a song by the Vels from House of Miracles
 Guardian Angel, a sub-label of the Dutch record label Basic Beat Recordings

Television and film 
 The Guardian Angel (1942 film), a 1942 French comedy film
 Guardian Angel (TV series), a 2001 South Korean drama
 Guardian Angel (web series), a 2018–2019 Hong Kong insurance drama web series
 "Guardian Angel" (Diagnosis: Murder), an episode of Diagnosis: Murder
 "Guardian Angels" (House), an episode of House
 The Guardian Angel (1978 film) (L'Ange gardien), a Canadian film directed by Jacques Fournier
 Guardian Angel (1987 film) (Andjeo Cuvar), a Yugoslavian film directed by Goran Paskaljevic
 Guardian Angel (1994 film), an action-thriller drama starring Cynthia Rothrock
 Guardian Angels (film), a 1995 French crime-action comedy starring Gérard Depardieu
 The Guardian Angel (1990 film) (Skyddsängeln), a Swedish film directed by Suzanne Osten
 Guardian Angel (2014 film) (L'Ange gardien), a Canadian film directed by Jean-Sébastien Lord
 Murderous Trance, a 2018 psychological thriller also known as The Guardian Angel

Other uses 
 Angel Guardian (born 1998), Filipina actress and singer
 Guardian Angels, an international safety organization
Guardian Angels, artworks by contemporary American artist Kris Neely
 Guardian Angel (wrestler), Ray Traylor, American professional wrestler (1963–2004)
 Holy Guardian Angel, an occult term
 Ida Nudel (born 1931), Israeli former refusenik and activist